Tynes is a surname. Notable people with the surname include:

Andrew Tynes (born 1972), Bahamian sprinter
Buddy Tynes (1902–1984), American football player
Dustin Tynes (born 1996), Bahamian swimmer
Gunnar Örn Tynes (born 1979), Icelandic music producer
John Scott Tynes (born 1971), American writer
Lawrence Tynes (born 1978), Scottish-born American football player